Dionne is a studio album by American singer Dionne Warwick. It was released by Arista Records in May 1979 in the United States. Recorded during the winter of 1978–79, the album marked Warwick's debut with the label. Production on Dionne was helmed by Barry Manilow, who was paired with Warwick by Arista founder Clive Davis. Her highest-charting album since Soulful (1969), Dionne peaked at number 12 on the US Billboard 200 album chart and went platinum in the US.

Lead single "I'll Never Love This Way Again" became a major hit, reaching number five on the US Billboard Hot 100. The song was certified gold by the Recording Industry Association of America (RIAA), and both it and  follow-up hit "Deja Vu" became Grammy Award winners at the 1980 ceremony. "After You," Dionnes's third top ten single and "Feeling Old Feelings" were also released as singles, with the latter receiving a Japanese release only. Her performance of the song earned Warwick the grand prize at the Tokyo Music Festival for Song of the Year.

Track listing
All tracks produced by Barry Manilow.

Personnel and credits 
Musicians

 Dionne Warwick – lead vocals, backing vocals (1, 3, 9)
 Barry Manilow – acoustic piano, rhythm track arrangements, backing vocals (2-6, 8, 10)
 Bill Mays – keyboards
 Mitch Holder – guitars, Mitch Holder and Thom Rotella (3,4)
 Will Lee – bass guitar
 Rick Shlosser – drums
 Alan Estes – percussion
 Sid Sharp – concertmaster
 Shaun Harris – contractor 
 Greg Mathieson – orchestration (1, 6)
 Gene Page – orchestration (2, 5, 9, 10)
 Artie Butler – orchestration (3, 4)
 Jimmie Haskell – orchestration (7, 8)
 Ron Dante – backing vocals (2-6, 8, 10)

Production

 Producer – Barry Manilow
 Production Assistant – Paul Brownstein
 Engineer – Michael DeLugg
 Assistant Engineer – Peter Darmi
 Recorded at United Western Studios (Hollywood, California).
 Art Direction – Donn Davenport
 Photography – Harry Langdon 
 Insert Photography – Jay Thompson 
 Hair Stylist – Clifford Peterson

Charts

Weekly charts

Year-end charts

Certifications

References

External links
Dionne at Discogs

Dionne Warwick albums
1979 albums
Albums arranged by Gene Page
Albums arranged by Jimmie Haskell
Arista Records albums